Nikos Pantelis (born 6 October 1959) is a Greek professional football manager and former player.

Career
Born in Athens, Pantelis began playing football as a defender for Panionios F.C., making 36 Alpha Ethniki appearances during his time with the club. In 1981, he signed with Egaleo F.C., where he would make a further 38 Alpha Ethniki appearances over a four-year spell.

After he retired from playing, Pantelis became a football coach. He was first appointed manager by Kerkyra F.C. in 1996. He managed several Greek second and third level clubs over the following 15 years. Pantelis did manage Alpha Ethniki side Panionios for three matches in 2005.

In June 2011, Pantelis was arrested during a probe into match-fixing when he was manager of Ethnikos Asteras F.C., and the Football League imposed a two-year ban. However, Pantelis appealed and was found innocent by the Football League's Disciplinary Committee.

Pantelis was appointed manager of Kallithea for a second time in December 2011 following the unexpected departure of Vangelis Goutis.

References

External links
Profile at Onsports.gr
Nikos Pantelis at Soccerway

1959 births
Living people
Panionios F.C. players
Egaleo F.C. players
Athinaikos F.C. players
Greek football managers
Athinaikos F.C. managers
PAS Lamia 1964 managers
Ilisiakos F.C. managers
Panionios F.C. managers
Agios Dimitrios F.C. managers
Kallithea F.C. managers
A.O. Kerkyra managers
Ilioupoli F.C. managers
Ethnikos Asteras F.C. managers
Ethnikos Piraeus F.C. managers
Vyzas F.C. managers
A.O. Glyfada F.C. managers
Iraklis Psachna F.C. managers
Paniliakos F.C. managers
Olympiacos Volos F.C. managers
Panargiakos F.C. managers
Fostiras F.C. managers
AO Chania F.C. managers
Diagoras F.C. managers
GAS Ialysos 1948 F.C. managers
Association football defenders
Footballers from Athens
Greek footballers